Kéraban the Inflexible (1883) is an adventure novel written by Jules Verne.

Synopsis
Jan van Mitten and his valet Bruno (both of Rotterdam, Holland) are in Istanbul, Turkey. The pair are going to meet with Van Mitten's tobacco business associate, a headstrong man named Kéraban. At Van Mitten's meeting, Kéraban decides to take them to dinner at his home in Scutari, on the other side of the Bosphorus Strait. Just before they are going to cross the Strait, a tax is imposed on all vessels that can be used to cross the strait.

Enraged by this new tax, Kéraban decides to take his associates to Scutari by traveling seven hundred leagues around the perimeter of the Black Sea, so that he won't have to pay the paltry ten para tax. The principled Kéraban and his reluctant traveling companions begin the journey; the only deadline for Kéraban is that he must be back in six weeks time, so that he may depart in time to arrange for his nephew's wedding to a young woman, who must be married before she turns seventeen. If she doesn't meet that deadline, she won't inherit 100,000 Turkish pounds.

Unfortunately for Kéraban and friends, the villains Yarhud, Scarpante, and the man they work for, Seigneur Saffar, have plans to ensure that the young woman marries Saffar instead before the deadline.

Publication history
1883-1884 USA: New York, G. Munro, published as The Headstrong Turk
1887, UK, London: Sampson Low, Marston, Searle, & Rivington, 1887. First UK edition. Published in two volumes: The Captain of the Guidara and Scarpante the Spy

External links
  
  
 epguides.com
 julesverne.ca

1883 French novels
Novels by Jules Verne
Novels set in the Ottoman Empire
Novels set in Istanbul